Sterling Renaissance Festival is a Renaissance Festival that operates in Sterling, New York. Since 1976, it runs for seven consecutive weekends through July and August and features music, comedy, and interactive theatre performances as well as the work of artisans and craftspeople.

The COVID-19 pandemic caused the 45th festival to be cancelled in 2020; it was deferred to 2021.

Setting
The setting is the year 1585 in the fictional village of Warwick, which rambles across a wooded hillside and includes many permanent structures (some two-story) on the occasion of their annual festival. Queen Elizabeth is in attendance in the company of the members of her court, including various real-life historical figures, such as Sir Walter Raleigh and Sir Francis Drake.  These ladies and gentlemen of the court perform shows, such as the human chess match and Tea with the Queen, in addition to interacting with patrons.  The entirety of village life is represented by the cast, known as the Wyldewood Players (formerly, the Bless-the-Mark Players). The cast of costumed actors portray all kinds of villagers; gypsies, pirates, washer-wenches and others.  They stroll the grounds, improvising scenarios to entertain the patrons.

Costumed entertainers include Renaissance musicians, bagpipers, illusionists, jugglers, sword-swallowers, fortune-tellers, and comedy acts.  Twice daily the performers join together in a parade through the Festival grounds, and the Festival closes each evening with a pub sing in which everyone is encouraged to sing along.

At the base of the west-facing hillside is the jousting field.  Here, full-contact jousting takes place, as well as displays of archery and (on Highland weekend) Highland games.  In addition, patrons can ride the war-horses of the jousters for a small fee.

Attractions

Stage shows
Sterling has a paid cast known as the Wyldewood Players, as well as musicians, acrobats, acting troupes, sword-swallowers, comedy acts, roving players who interact with patrons, and many more (see "Performers" below for a partial listing).

Arts and crafts
Like most Faires, the Sterling Renaissance Festival has a large number of artisans and craftspeople, such as glass-blowers, blacksmiths, bookbinders, and potters. Other vendors and wares include leather and costuming shops, weapons, custom footwear, walking sticks, musical instruments, jewelry, toys, and woodworking.

Games
There are also a number of games of skill available for an additional fee, such as archery, axe-throwing, "Tomato Justice" (where participants pelt a man with ripe tomatoes), the Ladder of Truth, and the Pillow Fyte.  Several human-powered rides are available.

Food
Various foods are available, including such Faire staples as turkey legs and shish-kabobs, but also including vegetarian items like portobello mushroom sandwiches and fresh fruit.  The Rose & Crown Tavern  (renamed in 2010 from the "Bad Dog Tavern") serves alcohol, including mead, and has a selection of meat pies, bacon-wrapped scallops, and other foods.  In the past, the Tavern has featured live entertainment.

Themed weekends
Each weekend has a formal theme that will often inform the storyline acted out by the townsfolk.  Current and past themes include Family Appreciation Weekend (discount tickets for families). Marketplace Weekend (purchases from vendors earn free tickets), Ale Fest Weekend, Highland Fling (Scottish music and competitions), Pirate Invasion, Romance Weekend, and Fantasy Weekend.

"Lost Warwick"
In the summer of 2020 the COVID-19 pandemic forced the cancellation of the regular season.  In response, creative director Gary Izzo teamed up with members of the regular cast and independent performers to write, produce, and film an original six-episode story entitled "The Legend of Lost Warwick".  The story follows the leading citizens of Sterling (the Lord and Lady Mayor, the Sheriff, and others) trying to plan for a pending visit from the Queen of England, when they realize that the entire village has mysteriously vanished.  New installments aired weekly on Saturday afternoons during what would have been the festival's usual run (July 11 through Aug. 15), with previous episodes becoming available for on-demand streaming.  There was also a live "Tavern Talk" episode on the preceding (Friday) evening.  Each Saturday episode not only furthered the story, but also showcased artisans, musicians, and stage shows, and was interspersed with live discussion from the Warwick Inn featuring a different special guest.  The show was filmed on the Festival grounds, and all profits went to Renaissance Entertainers Services and Crafters United (RESCU).

In August 2021, 19 cast-members of the 26-person Wyldewood Players cast walked out on their contracts on the last weekend due to concern over a single breakthrough infection case of COVID-19 within the cast. All cast members were fully vaccinated and boosted, as required by the Festival. The Festival paid them their full pay for the final weekend anyway.  Independent festival acts stepped up to cover the 24 missing stage shows in an extraordinary act of support.  The "show went on," and the festival was saved from grave financial risk in its recovery from the previous cancelled season.

Performers
The Wyldewood Players, the oldest full-time professional acting troupe of any Renaissance Festival, comprise The Queen, her court, and the Warwick villagers (barber-surgeon, washer wenches, mud beggars, gravedigger, etc.).  Entertainments include The Queen's Tea, Her Majesty's Daily Diversion, Trial & Dunke, and a daily Publick Execution.  The Players' creative director Gary Izzo has more than 30 years' experience with interactive theatre, including with Disney theme parks, and is the author of The Art of Play: The New Genre of Interactive Theatre  (Heinemann Drama, 1997) and Acting Interactive Theatre: A Handbook (Pearson Education, 1998).

Other regular acts at the Fair include the following:

Patron participation
Many Fair attendees come in costume ("garb"), and booths inside the grounds offer garb for sale or rent.  Renaissance, fantasy, pirate, and steampunk are favorite themes.  In 2008, for the first time, peace-tied period weapons were permitted.

Sterling has an active group of long-time season ticket-holders known as "Family of Faire", many of whom have developed their own characters and attend every weekend of the season.

Ownership
The Festival was founded in 1976 by Dennis Ouellette Sr., and later owned and operated by Gerald and Virginia Young for more than thirty years.

In early 2008 the Fair was purchased by Doug Waterbury, who also owns an amusement park in Sylvan Beach and other entertainment venues in Central New York.  Waterbury invested $2 million in the business.  Several new stages were constructed and existing ones refurbished, and the number of performers was boosted for the 2008 season.  Waterbury planned to use the site for additional events, and install a larger jousting theater which could also be used for outdoor concerts.

Since taking ownership of the Festival, Doug Waterbury has been involved in a number of legal controversies, including refusals to provide legally-required safety inspections for the Festival as well as numerous sexual harassment allegations, arrests, and lawsuits.

In popular culture
Jamie Denbo, creator of Lifetime's American Princess, is a former Sterling cast member.

See also 
 Renaissance fair
 List of Renaissance fairs
 Reenactment
 Jousting
 Society for Creative Anachronism
 List of open air and living history museums in the United States

References

External links

Festival Facebook page
Festival website
Virtual Sterling
New Riders of the Golden Age (jousting company)

Recurring events established in 1976
Renaissance fairs
Festivals in New York (state)
Tourist attractions in Cayuga County, New York